Koloman Gögh (7 January 1948 – 11 November 1995) was a Czechoslovak footballer of Hungarian ethnicity.

Biography
Gögh was born in Kladno in what is today the Czech Republic, but began playing football in Kolárovo, a town with over 80% of Hungarian minority.

After that he played for the junior team of Komárno, and fulfilled his national service duties in Dukla Holešov serving as a paratrooper.

After military service, Gögh resumed his football career at ŠK Slovan Bratislava. He played for Czechoslovakia national football team in 1975 and 1976 when they won the 1976 European Football Championship; in that period he played in 55 matches and scored one goal. Gögh was a participant in the 1980 UEFA European Championship.

Later he worked as coach, returning from a game Gögh died in a car accident. FK Kolárovo named stadium in his honour Štadión Kolomana Gögha (Gőgh Kálmán Sportpálya).

References

External links
 
 Gögh at Slovan Bratislava 

1948 births
1995 deaths
Slovak footballers
Sportspeople from Kladno
Czechoslovak footballers
Czechoslovak expatriate footballers
ŠK Slovan Bratislava players
FC DAC 1904 Dunajská Streda players
Road incident deaths in Austria
UEFA Euro 1976 players
UEFA Euro 1980 players
UEFA European Championship-winning players
Czechoslovakia international footballers
Slovak people of Hungarian descent
Association football defenders
Czechoslovak expatriate sportspeople in Austria
Expatriate footballers in Austria